Nehal Bibodi (born 18 March 1971) is an Indian born Ugandan cricketer. He appeared in Uganda's Intercontinental Cup campaign in 2005.

1971 births
Living people
Ugandan cricketers
Ugandan people of Indian descent
Cricketers from Gujarat